"Looking for America" is a song by American singer-songwriter Lana Del Rey. The song was written and produced by Del Rey and Jack Antonoff. The song was written as a response to the back-to-back shootings in Dayton and El Paso on August 3, 2019. The song was previewed on Instagram on August 5, the day it was written. After gaining positive feedback and popularity online, the song was officially released onto streaming platforms as a digital single on August 9.

Background and development
On August 5, 2019, Del Rey released a video of her singing a new song she had written in the studio that day with producer Jack Antonoff on guitar and engineer Laura Sisk. The track was written following the back-to-back El Paso and Dayton mass shootings. Del Rey commented on the song's meaning, stating "Now I know I'm not a politician and I'm not trying to be so excuse me for having an opinion- but [I wrote the song] in light of all of the mass shootings and the back to back shootings in the last couple of days which really affected me on a cellular level." The video quickly attained popularity, gaining over a million views within a few days. She was inspired while visiting the Central Valley of California, while mentioning the City of Fresno, California, and many others.

Release
Del Rey subsequently released the song internationally on August 9 as a single, the same day her cover for "Season of the Witch" was released. The single is a standalone release and is not included on Del Rey's album, Norman Fucking Rockwell. An accompanying audio video was posted onto Del Rey's YouTube and Vevo channel on August 9. Del Rey announced the day of the release that she would use all of her proceeds from the song to support the Gilroy Garlic Festival Victims Relief fund, El Paso Community Relief Fund and Dayton Foundation.

Critical reception
Upon release, the song received praise from critics and fans alike. Anna Gaca of Pitchfork was positive in her review, comparing the song to Del Rey's other politically-charged single, "Coachella – Woodstock in My Mind", adding that the "This nostalgic Americana doesn't just go back to Woodstock—it predates the Kennedy assassination. Now each of us who visit a public space live in fear, and in fear begin to curtail our own freedoms." Carlos De Loera of the Los Angeles Times further supported the comparison to "Coachella" and added that "The song's poignant lyrics reflect Del Rey's longing for a better, less fearful vision of her country."

Bradley Stern of MuuMuse praised the song, commenting "Beyond just being a beautiful, classically wistful, hauntingly sung Lana song about less worrisome days gone by while longing for a more peaceful future." Donna Balance of California Rocker added that "the lyrics to the new song don't play around and in her own delicate fashion, Del Rey makes some strong statements about [the] reality that Americans still face, despite repeated mass attacks and demands for more stringent gun laws." Trey Alson of MTV referred to the track as "timeless" in his coverage of the release, further adding how Del Rey "sings somberly about a country in need of improvements to its gun control."

The New York Times included the song its weekly "songs of the week" playlist. Time magazine also included the song in a best songs of the week article.

Charts

Release history

References

2010s ballads
2019 songs
2019 singles
Interscope Records singles
Lana Del Rey songs
Polydor Records singles
Song recordings produced by Jack Antonoff
Songs written by Jack Antonoff
Songs written by Lana Del Rey
Protest songs
Songs about the United States
Mass shootings in the United States
Songs about violence